This is a list of the France national football team's unofficial results from their inception to the present day that are not accorded the status of official internationals, not being recognized by FIFA. Player appearances and goals in these matches are also not counted to their totals.

Exhibition (unofficial) matches

1900s

1910s

1915
Probably because of the war period (World War I), the results of matches between 1915 and 1918 are not shown in official overviews. The Dutch newspaper De Telegraaf, however, listed three France–Belgium matches in this period together with the matches between 1905 and 1914, without noting a difference in status. Also in this period, they faced Italy twice as a France-Belgium representative team.

1919 Inter-Allied Games 
In the summer of 1919, France participated in the Inter-Allied Games in Paris, on the occasion of the celebration of the Allied victory in World War I. Nine players from this side played for the main team and five participated in the 1920 Summer Games in the following year. They comfortably beat Romania and Greece, before beating Italy 2–0 in the final group match to secure a place in the final, where they were beaten 2–3 by Czechoslovakia.

1920s

1930s

1960s

1970s

1980s

1990s

2000s

References 

Unofficial
Lists of national association football team unofficial results